Steve Klink is an American composer and jazz pianist.

Steve Klink's funky piano style together with his distinct songwriting and arranging abilities makes for a striking blend of jazz, gospel, swing, blues and folk music.

Steve has performed extensively for television and radio with his Steve Klink trio, and in the last 6 years alone has performed over four hundred concerts. He also performs with his wife Slovenian jazz vocalist Mia Žnidarič.

Steve Klink trio have released 13 CDs.
In 1999, with the support of ACT Music's Ziggy Loch, Steve was able to release Blue Suit with drummer Gregory Hutchinson. In 2000 Steve was invited by Minor Music label chief Stephan Meyner to produce a series of CDs featuring songs by two of today's most revered and venerable songwriters, Joni Mitchell and Randy Newman.

Partial Discography of Steve Klink trio 
 Invisible Orchestra
 Blue suit
 Feels like home
 Places to come from, places to go
 Too close for comfort
 Under the influence
 Iskre
 Pobarvanka
 I wish I knew how
 Hold my hand
 Live in Concert
 Searching the Blue
Their latest album is The Ocean, released in 2012.

References

External links 
 

Living people
American jazz pianists
American male pianists
American jazz composers
American music arrangers
21st-century American pianists
American male jazz composers
21st-century American male musicians
Year of birth missing (living people)